Campestanol is a natural phytosterol.

External links
 Phytosterol effects on milk and yogurt microflora

Phytosterols